Springfield metropolitan area may refer to the following places:

Springfield metropolitan area, Illinois
Springfield metropolitan area, Massachusetts
Springfield metropolitan area, Missouri
Springfield metropolitan area, Ohio